Marples Ridgway was a British civil engineering company founded in 1948 by engineer Reginald Ridgway and accountant Ernest Marples. Marples later became British Minister of Transport.  In 1964, the company was taken over by the Bath and Portland Group.

During Marples' tenure as Minister of Transport, he was accused of self-dealing and conflict of interest. This included the awarding of construction projects to Marples Ridgway such as the Hammersmith and Chiswick flyovers, various national motorway network, as well as several dams and power stations. The company was also awarded major civil engineering projects in the colonies (e.g. Port Esquival in Jamaica, road networks in Ethiopia).

Projects completed:
Brunswick Wharf Power Station (1956)
Allt na Lairige Dam (1956)
Chiswick flyover (1959)
Hammersmith flyover (1961)
Skelton Grange Power Station
Port Esquivel shipping terminal, Jamaica
Bromford Viaduct 
A329(M) motorway 
M56 motorway 
M27 motorway

References

Construction and civil engineering companies of the United Kingdom
British companies established in 1948
Construction and civil engineering companies established in 1948
British companies disestablished in 1964
Construction and civil engineering companies disestablished in the 20th century